Judith Uwizeye is a lawyer, academic and politician in Rwanda, who has served as the Cabinet Minister in the Office of the President, since 31 August 2017. From July 2014 until August 2017, she served as the cabinet minister of public service and labour in the Cabinet of Rwanda.

Background
She was born in Rwanda, on 20 August 1979. She obtained her Bachelor of Laws from the National University of Rwanda in 2006. She then proceeded to the University of Groningen in the Netherlands where she graduated with a Master's degree in International Economic and Business Law.

Career
In 2006, Uwizeye began teaching in the faculty of law at the then National University of Rwanda, in Huye. The institution has since merged with other public higher institutions of learning to become University of Rwanda. At the time of her ministerial appointment in 2014, she had risen to the rank of Assistant Lecturer, in international economics and business law.

Personal
Judith Uwizeye is married to Manase Ntihinyurwa, a customs officer with the Rwanda Revenue Authority, and together are the parents of two young children.

See also
 Parliament of Rwanda
 Rosemary Mbabazi

References

External links
Website of the Rwanda Ministry of Public Service and Labour

Living people
1979 births
Rwandan lawyers
Rwandan women lawyers
Women government ministers of Rwanda
Academic staff of the National University of Rwanda
National University of Rwanda alumni
University of Groningen alumni
Academic staff of the University of Rwanda
Government ministers of Rwanda
21st-century Rwandan women politicians
21st-century Rwandan politicians